Audra Mae (born February 20, 1984) is an American singer and songwriter from Oklahoma City, Oklahoma. She is the great-great-niece of Judy Garland, and a great granddaughter of Garland's sister Jimmie. Since arriving in California in 2007, she has signed a publishing deal with Warner/Chappell, and sang Bob Dylan's "Forever Young" on the television series Sons of Anarchy. In 2009, she signed to Los Angeles-based indie label SideOneDummy Records.

Career

2009: Haunt EP
She released a digital EP Haunt on October 20, 2009 and then went on the road as part of Chuck Ragan's Revival Tour. That year, Audra also wrote a song for Britain's Got Talent runner up Susan Boyle's début album. "Who I Was Born to Be" was the only original track on Susan Boyle's chart-topping, 9 million- selling I Dreamed a Dream album. Audra Mae has performed as a member of The Upright Cabaret.

2010–2012: The Happiest Lamb and Audra Mae and the Almighty Sound
The Happiest Lamb was released on May 18, 2010. The album was recorded with her friends including stand-up bassist Joe Ginsberg, guitarist Jarrad Kritzstein, pianist Frank Pedano and drummer Kiel Feher, who have played live with her in a series of residencies around the L.A. area. Together with Ferras Alqaisi she wrote "Good News", which was one of the songs that competed in Unser Song für Deutschland, the German selection process to select the song that Lena Meyer-Landrut will sing at the Eurovision Song Contest 2011. "Good News" also serves as the title track of Meyer-Landrut's eponymous 2011 album.

Audra Mae and the Almighty Sound was released on February 13, 2012. The album featured main and background vocals, percussion, production and composition work from Mae and also credited many other artists, including up-right bassist Joe Ginsberg, electric and rhythm guitarist Jarrad Kritzstein and organ and piano playing by Frank Pedano. In 2012, her cover of Whitesnake's "Here I Go Again" was featured in two episodes of The Good Wife, "Another Ham Sandwich" and "Live from Damascus." She also is featured on Flo Rida's track, "Run," with Redfoo of LMFAO, and on All American Rejects "Kids in the Street" released March 2012.

2013–present
Mae provided background vocals for The All-American Rejects (who also originated in Oklahoma) in their fourth studio album, Kids in the Street. She can be heard in "Fast & Slow", "Kids in the Street", and "Beekeeper's Daughter" In 2013, she was featured in 3 Avicii songs that were featured on his album True. The songs are "Addicted to You", "Shame on Me", and "Long Road To Hell". Avicii announced that "Addicted to You" would receive a full single release on April 7, 2014. She is featured in one of Jon Bellion's songs called "Luxury," which was released on September 2, 2014.
Mae also co-wrote the songs "Somebody Loves Somebody" and "Breakaway" for Celine Dion, which were featured on Dion's album Loved Me Back to Life.

American country artist Miranda Lambert recorded Mae's "Little Red Wagon" for her 2014 album, Platinum, and released it as the album's third single in January 2015. It became a Top 10 hit on the Billboard Hot Country Songs chart, peaking at number 5. In 2015 she teamed up with Avicii once again to sing the cover by Avicii of "Feeling Good" by Nina Simone.

In February, 2018, Mae released the album Love, Audra Mae, called "a love letter to the music of her ancestry, the loyal fans who've touched her heart and the enchantments of romances never forgotten."

On December 5, 2019 Mae performed songs she created with EDM artist Avicii at the Avicii Tribute Concert for Mental Health. All proceeds from this concert contributed to the Tim Bergling Foundation.

Toured with

 2009 – Chuck Ragan
 2009 – Kevin Seconds
 2009 – Frank Turner
 2009 – Jim Ward
 2010 – Good Old War
 2010 – Stephen Kellogg
 2011 – Nick 13
 2011 – Lucero
 2012 – Matt Nathanson
 2012 – The All-American Rejects
 2012 – Cory Branan

Discography

Studio albums

Extended plays

Singles

As featured artist

Guest vocals

Songwriting credits

References

External links
Audra Mae Official Website, sold
Audra Mae on Myspace
Sideonedummy Records Signs Audra Mae
Audra Mae on Facebook
Audra Mae – Rock The Vote

Singers from Oklahoma
Living people
SideOneDummy Records artists
1984 births
21st-century American singers
21st-century American women singers